Mala  is a Bollywood drama film. It was released in 1941. It was directed by Balwant Bhatt and had Rose, P. Jairaj and Jayant in pivotal roles.

References

External links
 

1941 films
1940s Hindi-language films
Indian black-and-white films
Indian drama films
1941 drama films
Hindi-language drama films